Arthur Howard (23 May 1866 – 26 March 1951) was a New Zealand cricketer. He played in seven first-class matches for Wellington and Hawke's Bay from 1895 to 1906.

See also
 List of Wellington representative cricketers

References

External links
 

1866 births
1951 deaths
New Zealand cricketers
Wellington cricketers
Hawke's Bay cricketers
Cricketers from Auckland